The Centre Hospitalier Universitaire Notre Dame de Secours (مستشفى سيدة المعونات الجامعي) is a Lebanese private community hospital is located in Byblos, Lebanon. It is Non profit community hospital owned by the Lebanese Maronite Order and Monastery of Our Lady of the Secours. The hospital is affiliated with the Holy Spirit University of Kaslik Faculty of Medicine and Medical Sciences  and the Higher Institute of Nursing Sciences.

History
The hospital was founded in 1978.

See also 
 Holy Spirit University of Kaslik

References

External links 
Centre Hospitalier Universitaire Notre Dame de Secours - official website

Hospital buildings completed in 1978
Medical education in Lebanon
Teaching hospitals
Byblos District
Maronite Church in Lebanon
Hospitals established in 1978
1978 establishments in Lebanon
Hospitals in Lebanon